Asur is a 2020 Indian Hindi-language crime thriller web series, produced by Tanveer Bookwala of Ding Entertainment for the video on demand platform Voot. The series stars Arshad Warsi, Barun Sobti,  Sharib Hashmi and Amey Wagh. The series is set in the context of a modern day serial killer having religious ties. Arshad Warsi made his OTT debut through this series.

Plot
Set in the backdrop of the mystical city of Varanasi, Asur follows Nikhil Nair, a forensic-expert-turned-teacher, who returns to his roots at the Central Bureau of Investigation, and along with his former mentor Dhananjay Rajpoot, finds himself caught in a cat-and-mouse game with a brutal serial killer. What follows is a blend of suspense, mythology and the murders of some people totally unrelated.

Concept

The concept is completely new.
This web series has been created by adapting Hindu mythology to the modern age.
The whole team of a serial killer has been committing various murders on a regular basis, and despite the best efforts of the Central Bureau of Investigation (CBI) team it has not been possible to stop these killings.
This has not yet been fully disclosed Who is the mastermind of the murder, it may be known in Season 2.

Season 2 Prediction

The ending of Asur web series leaves many possibilities for the plot of the second season. The revelation that the real Shubh is still at large and has many allies who follow his commands means that the battle between good and evil will continue. Additionally, the murder of Lolark Dubey and the promotion of Nushrat suggests that there may be new characters entering the story in the next season.

Furthermore, the conflict between Dhananjay and Nikhil, with Nikhil blaming Dhananjay for his daughter's death, may result in a battle between the two characters. Dhananjay's suspension from duty may also play a role in the plot of the second season.

Overall, the ending of Asur leaves many unanswered questions and unresolved conflicts, which sets the stage for an intriguing plot for the second season.

Cast
 Arshad Warsi as Dhananjay "DJ" Rajpoot
 Barun Sobti as Nikhil Nair
 Anupriya Goenka as Naina Nair
 Ridhi Dogra as Nushrat Saeed
Sharib Hashmi as Lolark Dubey
Amey Wagh as Rasool Shaikh/Shubh Joshi
Pawan Chopra as Shashank Awasthi
Vishesh Bansal as Teen Shubh Joshi
Gaurav Arora as Kesar Bhardawaj
 Anvita Sudarshan as Raina Singh
 Nishank Verma as Samarth Ahuja
 Archak Chhabra as Aditya Jalan
 Aditya Lal as Moksh
 Deepak Qazir as Neelkanth Joshi
 Bondip Sarma as Ankit Sharma
 Jayant Raina as Radhacharan Joshi
 Sunayna Baile	as Lolark's Wife
 Jay Zaveri as Sajid Sheikh

Episodes

References

External links
 
 

2020 web series debuts
Hindi-language web series
Indian drama web series